Amy Winfrey (born May 1976) is an American animator, screenwriter, songwriter, director and voice actress. She is best known for creating the web series Making Fiends that was later picked up by Nickelodeon in 2008, and for directing several episodes of BoJack Horseman, including "The View From Halfway Down" and "Free Churro", which were each nominated for a Primetime Emmy Award for Outstanding Animated Program at the 71st and 72nd Primetime Creative Arts Emmys.

Career
Winfrey studied animation at UCLA and made a 3D film called The Bad Plant, which won her a silver medal at the Student Academy Awards in 2000. While attending school, Winfrey worked as an animator on South Park starting with the pilot episode, 'The Spirit of Christmas: Jesus vs. Santa' in 1995. When Comedy Central picked up the series, Winfrey remained part of the animation team and continued to work on the show, pausing her schooling to work on the feature film South Park Bigger, Longer & Uncut.

In a UCLA class, Winfrey made a website dedicated to traffic cones. Because of many visitors on the traffic cone website, Winfrey decided to create a series of short web cartoons, and the result was Muffin Films. The first was created as a thesis project in 2000 and lasted twelve episodes, one for each muffin in a dozen. The series explored different styles of Flash animation through twelve different shorts, using muffins as the subject of the stories. To celebrate the 10th Anniversary of Muffin Films, Amy Winfrey created six additional cartoons for the series.

In 2001, Winfrey created another web series, Big Bunny. Winfrey provided all of the voice acting, except for the eponymous character who is voiced by her husband, Peter Merryman. Winfrey pitched it as a series for NBC and Fox in 2002, but neither picked it up.

In 2008, Winfrey started Squid and Frog, short cartoons about a red squid and an orange frog, who sing about various things, such as that you can't learn surgery from television.

In 2012, Winfrey created an animated series concept for Disney Television Animation titled Lucky Beast, featuring the voice of Tom Kenny as the title character, but it was never picked up.

On 6 October 2018, Winfrey released a web cartoon called Hooray For Hell, co-created by Peter Merryman. The series is about a girl who wakes up in Hell after voting for president and gets a ticket to Heaven. There are three episodes available on YouTube. They can be found by clicking the link in the description of the trailer on Winfrey's main channel. After a hiatus, the show's final two episodes were uploaded on May 27, 2020.

Making Fiends 

Winfrey created Making Fiends in 2003 as a web cartoon. The series has 21 episodes created between 2003 and 2005. Winfrey voiced several characters, including Charlotte. Winfrey was able to produce web animation full time after she began selling merchandise of her characters online. Nickelodeon contacted Winfrey in early 2004 about bringing Making Fiends on TV. The series only had one season, airing from October 4 to November 1, 2008, on the secondary channel Nicktoons Network. Viacom, now Paramount Global, retained the rights to the property after the series was canceled. Despite the limited run, the series was named "Best Television Series" at Annecy International Animation Film Festival in 2008.

Recent work
For a five-year period between 2014 and 2019, Winfrey worked as director on all six seasons of the Netflix animated series BoJack Horseman, typically working on three episodes per season, including some of the series' most notable episodes, Zoës and Zeldas, Brand New Couch, Hank After Dark, Thoughts and Prayers, Ruthie, Free Churro, The New Client, and the show's penultimate episode, 'The View From Halfway Down.' She was nominated twice for the Primetime Emmy Award for Outstanding Animated Program by the Academy of Television Arts & Sciences for "Free Churro" and "The View From Halfway Down". She also worked on the second season of 'Greatest Party Story Ever', an animated episode of Adam Ruins Everything, the first season of Tuca & Bertie, and is currently a supervising producer on Velma.

Personal life 
Winfrey resides in Los Angeles, California with her husband, Peter Merryman. She has also been an educator teaching animation at the UCLA Animation Workshop.

Web series

Muffin Films 
Episode list

Big Bunny (2001) 
Episode list

Directing Credits

BoJack Horseman episodes 
Season One
 "Zoës and Zeldas"
 "The Telescope"
 "Downer Ending"
Season Two
 "Brand New Couch"
 "Still Broken"
 "Hank After Dark"
 "Escape from L.A."
Season Three
 "BoJack Kills"
 "Brrap Brrap Pew Pew"
 "Best Thing That Ever Happened"
 "That Went Well"
Season Four
 "See Mr. Peanutbutter Run"
 "Thoughts and Prayers"
 "Ruthie"
Season Five
 "The Dog Days Are Over"
 "Free Churro"
 "Head in the Clouds"
Season Six
 "The New Client"
 "A Quick One, While He's Away"
 "Sunk Cost and All That"
 "The View From Halfway Down"

References

External links
Official website

Muffin Films
Big Bunny
Making Fiends
Squid and Frog

American animators
American women animators
American animated film directors
American television directors
American voice actresses
American television actresses
American screenwriters
Songwriters from Colorado
American directors
Living people
American women cartoonists
Nickelodeon Animation Studio people
Showrunners
1976 births
American cartoonists
American women television directors
21st-century American women
Cartoon Network Studios people
University of California, Los Angeles alumni
UCLA School of Theater, Film and Television faculty
UCLA Film School alumni